Parafeyevka is a rural locality (a village) in Malinovsky Selsoviet, Belebeyevsky District, Bashkortostan, Russia. The population was 40 as of 2010. There are four streets.

Geography 
Parafeyevka is located 16 km south of Belebey (the district's administrative centre) by road. Malinovka is the nearest rural locality.

References 

Rural localities in Belebeyevsky District